Loweina rara is a species of lanternfish.

References

External links

Myctophidae
Fish described in 1892